North Lake (also Country Club Lake) is a reservoir  north of Clarksville, Texas (USA) in Red River County.  Its spillway has an elevation .  It lies in a heavily wooded area with hardwoods and pines.

References

External links 

Bodies of water of Red River County, Texas
Reservoirs in Texas
Protected areas of Red River County, Texas